William Henry Jones (29 January 1891 – 2 February 1961) was an Australian rules footballer who played with Richmond in the Victorian Football League (VFL).

Family
The son of former Williamstown footballer William Henry Jones (1862–1929) and Alice Jones (1866–1955), née Hall, William Henry Jones was born in Williamstown on 29 January 1891.

Football
Jones commenced his football career at St Killian's (Bendigo), playing in premiership teams in both 1908 and 1909 before moving to senior ranks in 1910 with California Gully in the Bendigo Football League where he gained a reputation as an excellent mark but inconsistent kick.

In 1911 he joined Richmond in the Victorian Football League and made his debut in their Round 1 clash with Collingwood. He scored two goals in the loss to Carlton in Round 5, where again it was noted that “Jones
again showed up well in the matter of marking, but failed lamentably in shooting for goal.”

In early 1913 Jones moved to Melbourne after failing to gain a place in Richmond’s team in the first few weeks of the season but he never played a senior game for Melbourne. Later that season he moved to the Ballarat League and played with Golden Square.

In 1914, Jones transferred to North Melbourne in the Victorian Football Association

Notes

External links 

1891 births
1961 deaths
Australian rules footballers from Melbourne
Richmond Football Club players
North Melbourne Football Club (VFA) players
People from Williamstown, Victoria